Bauyrzhan Murzabayev (Бауыржан Мұрзабаев; born September 17, 1992) is a Kazakhstani jockey currently active in Germany. He is the 3 time German flat racing Champion Jockey from 2019 to 2021.

Overview 
Murzabayev was born on September 17, 1992 in Almaty to a family that owned racehorses, which led him to grow an interest in horse racing. He first earned his jockey license in his native country in 2007 before moving to the Czech Republic, where he won the European Jockeys Cup in 2016 and 2018.

He started racing in Germany also, and is currently running for Peter Schiergen. Under Schiergen, Murzabayev won the Deutsches Derby in 2022 as Sammarco's jockey.

In addition to German racecourses, Murzabayev has also raced in Japan, with his first race being the 2022 Japan Cup, and marking his first major victory in Japan by winning the Hopeful Stakes, where he managed to win the race while riding a 90–1 shot horse named Dura Erede.

References

External links 
 

Living people
1992 births
Kazakhstani jockeys
Sportspeople from Almaty